Chat Trakan is a subdistrict in the Chat Trakan District of Phitsanulok Province, Thailand.

Geography
Chat Trakan lies in the Nan Basin, which is part of the Chao Phraya Watershed.

Administration
The following is a list of the subdistrict's muban, which roughly correspond to the villages:

Temples
The following is a list of active Buddhist temples within Tambon Chat Trakan:
Wat Chat Trakan in Ban Chat Trakan
Wat Napaya in Ban Napaya
Wat Pak Grong in Ban Pak Rong
Wat Khok Phak Wan in Ban Khok Phak Wan
Wat Nam Pun in Ban Nam Phueng
Wat Nan Chan in Ban Pak Raet

References

Tambon of Phitsanulok province
Populated places in Phitsanulok province